The Bic Monastery is a Romanian Orthodox monastery in Bic, Șimleu Silvaniei, Romania.

Since 1997, inside Bic Monastery, there is the wooden church from Stâna; built in 1778 it has a rectangular plan with nave and pronave.

Photos

References

External links
 Şimleu Silvaniei, Stâna wooden church - Bic monastery

Places of worship in Șimleu Silvaniei
Monuments and memorials in Șimleu Silvaniei
Religious buildings and structures completed in 1996
Romanian Orthodox monasteries of Transylvania
Churches in Sălaj County
1996 establishments in Romania